Víctor Genes (29 June 1961 – 17 March 2019) was a Paraguayan association football attacking midfielder. He played professional football in Paraguay for Cerro Porteño. He was the football manager of Paraguay from 2013 to 2014.

Career
Genes played club football for Club 16 de Agosto de Luque, Sportivo Luqueño, Club Libertad, Club Sol de América, Aquidabán, Club Guaraní, Cerro Porteño and Club River Plate.

Genes made his international debut for the Paraguay national football team on 14 June 1991 in a Copa Paz de Chico match against Bolivia (0–1 win). He obtained a total number of three international caps, scoring no goals for the national side.

After he retired from playing, Genes became a football coach. He managed the Paraguay national football team during the 2001 Carlsberg Cup. He led Club Libertad to the 2003 Paraguayan Primera División title, before moving to Ecuador to manage Club Social y Deportivo Macará. He also managed José Gálvez FBC in Peru.

References

External links
Víctor Genes at Footballdatabase

1961 births
2019 deaths
Paraguayan footballers
Paraguayan football managers
Paraguay national football team managers
Paraguay international footballers
1991 Copa América players
Association football midfielders
Association football forwards
Cerro Porteño players
Club Libertad footballers
Club Libertad managers
José Gálvez FBC managers
Sportivo Trinidense managers
C.S.D. Macará managers
Independiente F.B.C. managers
Deportivo Capiatá managers